USS LST-578 was a  in the United States Navy during World War II. She was transferred to the Republic of China Navy as ROCS Chung Pang (LST-230).

Construction and commissioning 
LST-578 was laid down on 5 May 1945 at Chicago Bridge and Iron Company, Seneca, Illinois. Launched on 8 June 1945 and commissioned on 30 June 1945.

Service in United States Navy 
During World War II, LST-578 was assigned to the Asiatic-Pacific theater. She then participated in the Leyte landings from 5 to 18 November 1944. In 1945, she took part in the Lingayen Gulf landing from 4 to 17 January, the Mindanao Island landing from 10 to 18 March, 24 March to 14 April and 17 to 23 April 1945. She was assigned to occupation and China from 20 October 1945 to 29 June 1946.

She was decommissioned on 1 July 1946 and assigned to Commander Naval Forces Far East (COMNAVFE) Shipping Control Authority for Japan (SCAJAP), redesignated Q099. She was later transferred to the Military Sea Transportation Service (MSTS), 31 March 1952, placed in service as USNS T-LST-578. She was struck from the Naval Register on 6 February 1956 after she was transferred to the Republic of China and renamed Chung Pang (LST-230).

Service in Republic of China Navy 
On 23 August 2018, she was decommissioned.

On 29 July 2019, her together with her sister ship Chung Kuang served as a target ship for multiple F-16s fired Harpoon missiles and was hit.

In the exercise of Han Kuang 36 on July 15, 2020, she served as a target ship for Harpoon missiles. She refused to sink during the exercise. After the exercise ended on July 17, she was towed back to the naval pier in Qijin, Kaohsiung. The side of the hull has at least two holes visible from the missiles.

Awards 
LST-578 have earned the following awards:

American Campaign Medal 
Asiatic-Pacific Campaign Medal (3 battle stars)
World War II Victory Medal
Navy Occupation Service Medal (with Asia clasp)
Philippine Presidential Unit Citation
Philippine Liberation Medal (2 battle stars)

Gallery

Citations

Sources 
 
 
 
 

LST-542-class tank landing ships
Ships built in Evansville, Indiana
World War II amphibious warfare vessels of the United States
LST-542-class tank landing ships of the Republic of China Navy
1944 ships